"Let them eat cake" is the traditional translation of the French phrase "", said to have been spoken in the 18th century by "a great princess" upon being told that the peasants had no bread. The French phrase mentions brioche, a bread enriched with butter and eggs, considered a luxury food. The quote is taken to reflect either the princess's frivolous disregard for the starving peasants or her poor understanding of their plight. While the phrase is commonly attributed to Marie Antoinette, there are references to it prior to the French Revolution, and historians do not agree that she is likely to have said it.

Origins
The phrase appears in book six of Jean-Jacques Rousseau's autobiographical Confessions, whose first six books were written in 1765 and published in 1782. Rousseau recounts an episode in which he was seeking bread to accompany some wine he had stolen. Feeling too elegantly dressed to go into an ordinary bakery, he recalled the words of a "great princess": 

Rousseau does not name the "great princess", and he may have invented the anecdote all together, as the Confessions is not considered entirely factual.

Attribution to Marie Antoinette
The phrase was supposedly said by Marie Antoinette in 1789, during one of the famines in France during the reign of her husband, King Louis XVI. But it was not attributed to her until half a century later. Although anti-monarchists never cited the anecdote during the French Revolution, it acquired great symbolic importance in subsequent historical accounts when pro-revolutionary commentators employed the phrase to denounce the upper classes of the Ancien Régime as oblivious and rapacious. As one biographer of the Queen notes, it was a particularly powerful phrase because "the staple food of the French peasantry and the working class was bread, absorbing 50 percent of their income, as opposed to 5 percent on fuel; the whole topic of bread was therefore the result of obsessional national interest."

Rousseau's first six books were written in 1765, when Marie Antoinette was nine years of age, and published when she was 26, eight years after she became queen.

The increasing unpopularity of Marie Antoinette in the final years before the outbreak of the French Revolution also likely influenced many to attribute the phrase to her. During her marriage to Louis XVI, her critics often cited her perceived frivolousness and very real extravagance as factors that significantly worsened France's dire financial straits. Her Austrian birth and her gender also diminished her credibility further in a country where xenophobia and chauvinism were beginning to exert major influence in national politics. While the causes of France's economic woes extended far beyond the royal family's spending, anti-monarchist polemics demonized Marie Antoinette as Madame Déficit, who had single-handedly ruined France's finances. These libellistes printed stories and articles vilifying her family and their courtiers with exaggerations, fictitious anecdotes, and outright lies. In the tempestuous political climate, it would have been a natural slander to put the famous words into the mouth of the widely scorned queen.
  
The phrase was attributed to Marie Antoinette by Alphonse Karr in Les Guêpes of March 1843.

Attribution to Maria Theresa of Spain
Objections to the legend of Marie Antoinette and the comment centre on arguments concerning the Queen's personality, internal evidence from members of the French royal family and the date of the saying's origin. According to Antonia Fraser, the notorious story of the ignorant princess was first said 100 years before Marie Antoinette in relation to Marie-Thérèse, the wife of Louis XIV, citing the memoirs of Louis XVIII, who was only fourteen when Rousseau's Confessions were written and whose own memoirs were published much later. Louis XVIII does not mention Marie Antoinette in his account, but says that the story was an old legend and that the family always believed that Maria Theresa had originated the phrase. However, Louis XVIII is as likely as others to have had his recollection affected by the quick spreading and distorting of Rousseau's original remark.

Fraser also points out in her biography that Marie Antoinette was a generous patron of charity and moved by the plight of the poor when it was brought to her attention, thus making the statement out of character for her. This makes it even more unlikely that Marie Antoinette ever said the phrase.

A second consideration is that there were no actual famines during the reign of King Louis XVI and only two incidents of serious bread shortages, the first in April–May 1775, a few weeks before the king's coronation on 11 June 1775, and the second in 1788, the year before the French Revolution. The 1775 shortages led to a series of riots that took place in northern, eastern and western France, known at the time as the Flour War (guerre des farines). Letters from Marie Antoinette to her family in Austria at this time reveal an attitude largely contrary to the spirit of Let them eat brioche:

Another problem with the dates surrounding the attribution is that when the phrase first appeared, Marie Antoinette was not only too young to have said it, but living outside France as well. Although published in 1782, Rousseau's Confessions were finished thirteen years prior in 1769. Marie Antoinette, only fourteen years old at the time, would not arrive at Versailles from Austria until 1770. Since she was completely unknown to him at the time of writing, she could not have possibly been the "great princess" he mentioned.

Other attributions
Another hypothesis is that after the revolution, the phrase, which was initially attributed to a great variety of princesses of the French royal family, eventually stuck on Marie Antoinette because she was in effect the last and best-remembered "great princess" of Versailles. The myth had also been previously attributed to two of Louis XV’s daughters: Madame Sophie and Madame Victoire.

In his 1853 novel Ange Pitou, Alexandre Dumas attributes the quote to one of Marie Antoinette's favourites, the Duchess of Polignac. Also- The term "Cake" was commonly used to describe the burnt, blackened layer of dough that built up on the bottom of the communal outdoor bake ovens used by many poorer folk at the time. Thus a comment to "Let them eat cake." was a suggestion that the poor should consume the burnt, black and often moldy dough scraping from the ovens.

Similar phrases 

The Book of Jin, a 7th-century chronicle of the Chinese Jin Dynasty, reports that when Emperor Hui (259–307) of Western Jin was told that his people were starving because there was no rice, he said, "Why don't they eat porridge with (ground) meat?" (何不食肉糜), showing his unfitness.

In 2016, after an ill-received series of articles
were published which suggested that out-of-work Kentucky coalminers should "learn to code" in order to support their families, the same phrase has been used repeatedly in cynical repudiation and harassment against journalists who likewise find themselves out of work or are perceived as being out of touch or lacking in journalistic integrity.

See also
Noblesse oblige

References

Notes
a.In an earlier 1841 volume of Les Guêpes, a slightly different version of the famous phrase was quoted: "S’il n’y a pas de pain on mangera de la brioche".

Bibliography
 Barker, Nancy N., Let Them Eat Cake: The Mythical Marie Antoinette and the French Revolution, Historian, Summer 1993, 55:4:709.
 Campion-Vincent, Véronique and Shojaei Kawan, Christine, Marie-Antoinette et son célèbre dire : deux scénographies et deux siècles de désordres, trois niveaux de communication et trois modes accusatoires, Annales historiques de la Révolution française, 2002, p. 327

Political quotes
Marie Antoinette
English phrases
1780s neologisms
Works by Jean-Jacques Rousseau
Misquotations